Balquhain, also known as Balquhain Stone Circle, is a recumbent stone circle  from Inverurie in Scotland. It is a scheduled ancient monument.

Description and measurements
It is located in farmland at an altitude of c.  on a terraced hillside leading up to a prominent summit called Mither Tap. The circle originally consisted of 12 stones. Four remain standing, with another four fallen, the final four presumed to have been moved.

It is made of a type of white grained granite that has been suggested to have been brought some distance to the location. The stone east of the east flanker is made of red granite.

Alexander Thom suggested the circle had been  and Fred Coles of only . The circle also displays suggested rock art including cup marks and a noticeable rounded bump on the recumbent stone that resembles the outline of the prominent hill behind it.

Astronomical alignments
It was discovered in the 1980s that Balquhain had lunar associations. The eastern flanker is aligned to the most southerly moonrise at 172 degrees, whilst the western flanker is aligned to the minor moonset at 232 degrees. The major moonset is aligned over the central hump of the recumbent stone at 190 degrees.

References

External links
Illustrated entry in the Megalithic Portal

Stone Age sites in Scotland
Stone circles in Aberdeenshire
Archaeological sites in Aberdeenshire
Scheduled Ancient Monuments in Aberdeenshire
Inverurie